The 2015 FIBA Africa Championship for Women was the 22nd AfroBasket Women, played under the rules of FIBA, the world governing body for basketball, and FIBA Africa. The tournament was hosted by Cameroon from 24 September to 3 October, with games played at the Yaoundé. The winners qualified for the 2016 Summer Olympics.

Senegal won the title for the eleventh time by defeating hosts Cameroon 81–66.

Squads

Draw

Preliminary round
The draw was held on 9 May 2015.

All times are local (UTC+1).

Group A

Group B

Knockout stage

Bracket

5th place bracket

9th place bracket

Quarterfinals

9–12 place semifinals

5–8th place semifinals

Semifinals

Eleventh place match

Ninth place match

Seventh place match

Fifth place match

Bronze medal match

Final

Final standings

Awards

 Most Valuable Player:  Aya Traoré
 All-Star Team:
 PG –  Deolinda Ngulela
 SG –  Aya Traoré
 SF –  Ramses Lonlack
 PF –  Geraldine Robert
 C  –  Adaora Elonu

Statistical leaders

Points

Rebounds

Assists

Blocks

Steals

References

External links
Official website

2015
2015 in African basketball
2015 in Cameroonian sport
International sports competitions hosted by Cameroon
Sport in Yaoundé
Basketball in Cameroon
September 2015 sports events in Africa
October 2015 sports events in Africa
Events in Yaoundé